The 2004 NCAA Division I baseball season, play of college baseball in the United States organized by the National Collegiate Athletic Association (NCAA) at the Division I level, began on January 16, 2004.  The season progressed through the regular season, many conference tournaments and championship series, and concluded with the 2004 NCAA Division I baseball tournament and 2004 College World Series.  The College World Series, which consisted of the eight remaining teams in the NCAA tournament, was held in its annual location of Omaha, Nebraska, at Rosenblatt Stadium.  It concluded on June 27, 2004, with the final game of the best of three championship series.  Cal State Fullerton defeated Texas two games to none to claim its fourth championship.

Realignment

New programs
Three programs joined Division I for the 2004 season.  Dallas Baptist and Northern Colorado joined from Division II, while Utah Valley joined from the NJCAA.

Dropped programs
Two programs left Division I prior to the start of the season– Drexel, which dropped its varsity baseball program, and Morris Brown, which discontinued its varsity athletics program.

Conference changes
Both the Ohio Valley Conference (OVC) and the Big South Conference (Big South) added two teams entering the season.  The OVC added Jacksonville State and Samford, both from the Atlantic Sun Conference (A-Sun).  The Big South added Birmingham–Southern, an independent, and VMI, a former Southern Conference (SoCon) member.  To compensate for these moves, the A-Sun added Lipscomb, an independent, and the SoCon added Elon from the Big South.

Two other schools realigned prior to the start of the season.  UMBC moved from the Northeast Conference to the America East Conference, and Centenary moved from being an independent to the Mid-Continent Conference.

Conference formats
Both the Colonial Athletic Association, which had competed in American and Colonial divisions, and the Mid-Eastern Athletic Conference, which had competed in North and South divisions, eliminated their divisional formats.

Conference standings

College World Series

The 2004 season marked the fifty eighth NCAA Baseball Tournament, which culminated with the eight team College World Series.  The College World Series was held in Omaha, Nebraska.  The eight teams played a double-elimination format, with Cal State Fullerton claiming their fourth championship with a two games to none series win over Texas in the final.

Bracket

Award winners

All-America team

References 

2004 Division I Standings at BoydsWorld.com